This is a list of West Indian Test cricketers. A Test match is an international cricket match between two of the leading cricketing nations. The list is arranged in the order in which each player won his Test cap. Those players who won their first Test cap in the same Test match as other players who had such a win, are listed alphabetically by surname.

Players
Statistics are correct as of 11 March 2023.

See also 
 Test cricket
 West Indian cricket team
 List of West Indian women's Test cricketers
 List of West Indies ODI cricketers
 List of West Indies Twenty20 International cricketers

Notes

References

External links 
 Cricinfo
 Howstat

Test
West Indies